Dichagyris neoclivis is a species of cutworm or dart moth in the family Noctuidae. It was described by William Barnes and Foster Hendrickson Benjamin in 1924 and is found in North America.

The MONA or Hodges number for Dichagyris neoclivis is 10872.

References

 Crabo, L.; Davis, M.; Hammond, P.; Mustelin, T. & Shepard, J. (2013). "Five new species and three new subspecies of Erebidae and Noctuidae (Insecta, Lepidoptera) from Northwestern North America, with notes on Chytolita Grote (Erebidae) and Hydraecia Guenée (Noctuidae)". ZooKeys. 264: 85-123.
 Lafontaine, D. & Troubridge, J. (2010). "Two new species of the Euxoa westermanni species-group from Canada (Lepidoptera, Noctuidae, Noctuinae)". ZooKeys. 39: 255-262.
 Lafontaine, J. Donald & Schmidt, B. Christian (2010). "Annotated check list of the Noctuoidea (Insecta, Lepidoptera) of North America north of Mexico". ZooKeys. 40: 1-239.

Further reading

 Arnett, Ross H. (2000). American Insects: A Handbook of the Insects of America North of Mexico. CRC Press.

neoclivis
Moths described in 1924